Casseurs Flowters is a French hip hop duo established in 2004 by rappers Orelsan and Gringe. The duo's name is a reference to the two "Wet Bandits" from the movie Home Alone, called the "Casseurs Flotteurs" in the French dialogue.

History
The two rappers met in the year 2000 in Paris. Les Inrocks describe their meeting as being "as simple as a Franck Dumas match analysis."

Casseurs Flowters released their first mixtape Fantasy: Episode 1 with 11 tracks, with help from French record producer Skread, in 2004. Afterwards, the two rappers decided to focus on building their solo careers, with Orelsan releasing Perdu d'avance in 2009 and Le chant des sirènes in 2011, his first two studio albums, and Gringe releasing a mixtape entitled Fantasy Mixtape in 2009.

Following the success of Orelsan's second studio album Le chant des sirènes, the duo released their first collaborative single, "Bloqué", on 3 July 2013, as a pre-release for their upcoming debut studio album, Orelsan et Gringe sont les Casseurs Flowters, which was released on 15 November 2013 to generally positive reviews.

Other works
Gringe has released a number of independent materials and has collaborated with a number of artists such as El Matador, Brasco, Pit Baccardi, La Province, Jamal and Nubi.

Orelsan has also released a number of other independent materials, notably the Zéro EP with 14 tracks that included five tracks featuring his work with Gringe as Casseurs Flowters, namely "Arrêtes", "Toc Toc", "Mauvaises ondes", "Venu pour flowter" and "J'vais baiser ta femme".

Discography

Studio albums
 Orelsan et Gringe sont les Casseurs Flowters (2013)
 Comment c'est loin (2015)

Mixtapes
 Fantasy : Épisode 1 (2004)

Awards and nominations

References

External links

 
French rappers
French musical duos
Hip hop duos
Musicians from Caen
Living people
2004 establishments in France
Year of birth missing (living people)
Musical groups established in 2004